Grandisonia larvata is a species of caecilian in the family Indotyphlidae, endemic to the Seychelles islands of Mahé, Praslin, La Digue, and Silhouette.

References 

larvata
Endemic fauna of Seychelles
Amphibians described in 1934
Taxonomy articles created by Polbot